23rd Brigade may refer to:

Australia
 23rd Brigade (Australia)

Greece
 23rd Armoured Brigade (Greece)

Iran
 23rd Airborne Special Forces Brigade, former name of 65th Airborne Special Forces Brigade (Iran)

United Kingdom
 23rd Armoured Brigade (United Kingdom)
 23rd Infantry Brigade (United Kingdom)
 23rd (Nigerian) Brigade, later 1st (West Africa) Infantry Brigade, a World War II brigade
 23rd Brigade Royal Field Artillery

See also
 23rd Division (disambiguation)
 23rd Battalion (disambiguation)
 23 Squadron (disambiguation)